Romans is a commune in the Ain department in eastern France.

Geography
The village is located between Bresse and the Dombes. The river Renon flows through the commune from southeast to northwest. The other rivers in the area are the Irance in the east of the commune and the Chalaronne forming part of the commune's southwestern border.

Population

History

Early history
The land of Romans became in 917 the property of Cluny Abbey, when it was given by Ingelberge, wife of William I, Duke of Aquitaine who founded Cluny Abbey and the daughter of King Boso of Provence.

Romans was attached the lordship of Varax until it was definitively separated when Étienne de Varax son of Henri Varax the third, married Claudine de Saint Amour in 1396, and created the lordship of Romans.

Recent history
On 4 March 1718 Claude de Lyobard de Brion, Lord of Romans, sold the land of Romans to Claude César Ferrary, squire and King's Counsellor. Romans was transformed in an earldom named Romans-Ferrari in December 1763 thanks to Etienne-Lambert 1714 1766 
(son of Claude César)ref name=GUIGUE/> The last earl of Romans-Ferrari was Charles de Romans-Ferrari his descendant born in Romans the 16th of December 1861 deceased the 27th of June 1912 in Commercy.

Sights
 Saint-Maurice Church : Romanesque 12th-century church. The belltower has been reconstructed between 1856 and 1858.
 The 15th century castle modified in the 19th century. It was the property of the Lords of Romans, and from 1763 the property of the Earls of Romans-Ferrari. Now the castle hosts a medical-care home.

See also
Communes of the Ain department

References

External links

Dombes and Romans

Communes of Ain
Ain communes articles needing translation from French Wikipedia